The 2021 NASCAR All-Star Race (XXXVII) was a NASCAR Cup Series stock car exhibition race held on June 13, 2021, at Texas Motor Speedway in Fort Worth, Texas. Contested over 100 laps, it was the second exhibition race of the 2021 NASCAR Cup Series season.

Report

Background

The All-Star Race is open to race winners from last season through the 2021 Toyota/Save Mart 350 at Sonoma Raceway, all previous All-Star race winners, NASCAR Cup champions who had attempted to qualify for every race in 2021, the winner of each stage of the All-Star Open, and the winner of the All-Star fan vote are eligible to compete in the All-Star Race.

In 2020, the race was moved to Bristol Motor Speedway on July 15 as COVID-19 pandemic prevented Charlotte from accommodating fans. The venue changed again in 2021 to Texas Motor Speedway, which replaced its spring date with the All-Star Race.

Entry list
 (R) denotes rookie driver.
 (i) denotes driver who is ineligible for series driver points.

NASCAR All Star Open

NASCAR All-Star Race

Qualifying (Open)
Tyler Reddick was awarded the pole for the open as it was determined by current driver points.

Open Starting Lineup

Race recap 
For pre race ceremonies, Brigadier General Lisa M. Craig would give out the command to start engines. Austin Cindric (multiple inspection failures), Ross Chastain (aero duct not conforming to NASCAR regulations), and David Starr (unapproved adjustments) were forced to start at the back.

On the start of the race, Chris Buescher was found to had jumped the restart over Tyler Reddick, and thus was given a pass through penalty. Austin Cindric was also given a pass through penalty because NASCAR determined he had switched lanes before the start-finish line. 6 laps into the 20 lap Round 1, Bubba Wallace would spin in Turn 2, causing the first caution of the day. On the ensuing restart on lap 10, Stenhouse drifted up high in Turn 3, spinning out Chris Buescher, causing the second caution of the day. Once again, on the restart on lap 14, Erik Jones would spin after hitting Chase Briscoe and spinning out, causing a major stackup within the field. Daniel Suarez would hit Jones, causing major damage to both cars. After a hard fought battle, Ross Chastain would win Round 1.

In Round 2, after a relatively less chaotic race, Tyler Reddick would successfully defend against Aric Almirola to win Round 2.

In the final round, Aric Almirola would redeem himself, pulling away to win Round 3.

Matt DiBenedetto would win the fan vote.

Qualifying (All-Star Race)
Kyle Larson was awarded the pole for the race as determined by a random draw.

All-Star Race Starting Lineup

Race recap 
For driver introductions, Jamie Little and Adam Alexander announced each driver in order of the starting lineup, being accompanied by the Dallas Cowboys cheerleaders and music played by local cover band, the Clayton Foghat Band.

For pre race ceremonies, Norm Miller, chairman of Interstate Batteries gave the invocation, and the Side Deal gave an acapella version of the national anthem. Joe Gibbs and Tom Landry, Jr. would give out the command. While cars were doing warm up laps, Sammy Hagar would perform “I Can’t Drive 55”.

The race would start with Kyle Busch and Kyle Larson fighting for the lead, but on lap 2 Christopher Bell would lose control of his car in Turn 1, but would save the car. Nevertheless, the first caution was called.

NASCAR All Star Open

NASCAR All Star Open results

All-Star Race

In the main event, Kyle Larson was awarded the pole. Christopher Bell spun on the first lap, but saved the car from hitting anything. The race was broken into six segments with Larson, Ryan Blaney, Alex Bowman, William Byron, and Chase Elliott winning the segments. Elliott's team won the pit road challenge for the final segment. In the first segment, Larson passed and held off Brad Keselowski for the $1 million and his second All-Star Race win.

All-Star Race results

Media

Television
Fox Sports was the television broadcaster of the race in the United States. Lap-by-lap announcer, Mike Joy, Jeff Gordon and Clint Bowyer called the race from the broadcast booth. Jamie Little, Regan Smith and Vince Welch handled pit road for the television side. Larry McReynolds provided insight from the Fox Sports studio in Charlotte. This was also Fox Sports' last Cup race for their portion of the 2021 season as NBC Sports takes over NASCAR broadcasts for the rest of the season.

Radio
Motor Racing Network (MRN) continued their longstanding relationship with Speedway Motorsports to broadcast the race on radio. The lead announcers for the race's broadcast were Alex Hayden and Jeff Striegle. The network also implemented two announcers on each side of the track: Dave Moody in turns 1 and 2 and Mike Bagley in turns 3 and 4. Steve Post and Kim Coon were the network's pit lane reporters. The network's broadcast was also be simulcast on Sirius XM NASCAR Radio.

References

NASCAR All-Star Race
NASCAR All-Star Race
NASCAR All-Star Race
NASCAR races at Texas Motor Speedway
NASCAR All-Star Race